The Roman Catholic Diocese of Udupi is a diocese located in the Kallianpur town of Udupi District of Karnataka, India. It was announced by Pope Benedict XVI on 16 July 2012. It comprises the six civil talukas Udupi, Bramavara, Karkala, Kapu, Kundapura and Byndoor and is a suffragan of the Archdiocese of Bangalore. The diocese which now contains 47 parishes, the newly elevated Cathedral was previously a parish church as "Church of Our Lady of Miracles" or the Milagres Church, the parish was partitioned from the Mangalore Diocese, while the parish church was elevated to the Cathedral of Our Lady of Miracles.

Overview
The Udupi district had been a part of Diocese of Mangalore since 1887. The diocese was inaugurated on 15 October 2012 by Apostolic Nuncio of India, Salvatore Pennacchio at Milagres Cathedral, Kallianpur.  Bishop Gerald Isaac Lobo was appointed the first bishop of the diocese.

The Catholics of this district are Mangalorean Catholics. The Udupi diocese is the 9th in the province, 14th diocese in the state and 166th diocese in the country and is a suffragan of the Archdiocese of Bangalore.
The Roman Catholic Diocese of Mangalore (Latin: Diocesis Mangalorensis) is a diocese located in the city of Mangalore in the Ecclesiastical province of Bangalore in India. The diocese falls on the southwestern coast of India. At present, it comprises the whole civil districts of Dakshina Kannada and Udupi in Karnataka state. This region was collectively referred as South Canara during the British Raj and the early post-independence era, prior to the States Reorganisation Act in 1956. It was established as a separate Apostolic Vicariate from the Apostolic Vicariate of Verapoly in 1853 and was promoted to a diocese on 1 September 1886.

On Monday, July 16, 2012, it lost territory when Pope Benedict XVI erected the new Roman Catholic Diocese of Udupi (made up of the three civil districts of Udupi, Karkala, and Kundapura), which will also become part of the Province of Bangalore.[1]

On 28 June 2021, Fr Charles Menezes assumed charge as the Secretary of the Youth Commission and the Director of Indian Catholic Youth Movement for The Roman Catholic Diocese of Udupi

Bishops of the Diocese of Udupi
Bishop Gerald Isaac Lobo (15 October 2012 – Present)

Saints and causes for canonisation
 Servant of God Peter John Roche (Alfred of Moodahadu)

See also 
 Christianity in Karnataka
Diocese of Belthangady
Roman Catholic Diocese of Mangalore
Deanery of Belthangady
 Syro-Malankara Catholic Eparchy of Puttur
Most Holy Redeemer Church, Belthangady

References

External links
 Official Diocesan website
Udupi Diocese on GCatholic.org
Udupi Diocese on Catholic Hierarchy

 
Roman Catholic dioceses in India
Udupi
Christianity in Karnataka
2012 establishments in Karnataka
Christian organizations established in 2012
Roman Catholic dioceses and prelatures established in the 21st century